Zaine Sebastian Francis-Angol (born 30 June 1993) is a professional footballer who plays as a left-back or left winger for National League club Oldham Athletic.

Born in England, he represents the Antigua and Barbuda national team at international level.

Club career
Francis-Angol was signed by the Motherwell club in July 2011 after he started his career playing for the Tottenham Hotspur Reserves. He was a regular for the Motherwell Under 19's during 2011–12, but did not make a first team appearance. His performances for the Under 19's resulted in him being awarded with a new contract.

He made his debut for the first-team as a substitute in a 3–0 defeat against Panathinaikos in the UEFA Champions League Third qualifying round on 8 August 2012.

On 18 January 2013, Francis-Angol signed a new contract with Motherwell, keeping him at Fir Park until Summer 2015. He scored his first goal for the club in a 5–1 win over Partick Thistle on 29 December 2013.

On 2 June 2015, Motherwell announced that Francis-Angol was amongst the players leaving the club, with his contract having expired.

On 2 October 2015, Francis-Angol signed for Kidderminster Harriers on a short-term deal until January 2016. Francis-Angol scored on his first start for the club in a 1–1 home draw against Boreham Wood.

On 6 June 2017, Francis-Angol joined National League side AFC Fylde on a two-and-a-half-year deal. In July 2019, he joined Accrington Stanley on a one-year deal. On 24 June 2020 it was announced Francis-Angol would be leaving Accrington Stanley. After being released by Accrington Stanley, Francis-Angol joined Boreham Wood on 2 September 2020.

He joined Hartlepool United on 22 April 2021. Francis-Angol appeared as a substitute in the 2021 National League play-off Final as Hartlepool were promoted back to the Football League. Following the departure of Dave Challinor, Francis-Angol struggled for game time under Graeme Lee and on 24 March 2022, Francis-Angol signed for Stockport County on loan, joining his former manager Dave Challinor. At the end of the 2021–22, Francis-Angol was released by Hartlepool.

On 2 July 2022, Francis-Angol joined recently relegated National League club Oldham Athletic on a one-year contract.

International career
On 31 August 2012, London-born Francis-Angol was given a call-up to the Antigua and Barbuda squad for the upcoming World Cup qualifier against Guatemala and made his international debut by starting in the 3–1 loss. He qualifies due to his mother being from Antigua and Barbuda.

Career statistics

Honours
AFC Fylde
FA Trophy: 2018–19

Hartlepool United
National League play-offs: 2021

References

External links
Zaine Francis-Angol profile at Motherwell FC official website

1993 births
Living people
Footballers from the London Borough of Waltham Forest
English footballers
Antigua and Barbuda footballers
Antigua and Barbuda international footballers
Association football defenders
Association football wingers
Tottenham Hotspur F.C. players
Motherwell F.C. players
Kidderminster Harriers F.C. players
AFC Fylde players
Accrington Stanley F.C. players
Boreham Wood F.C. players
Hartlepool United F.C. players
Stockport County F.C. players
Oldham Athletic A.F.C. players
Expatriate footballers in Scotland
Scottish Premier League players
Scottish Professional Football League players
National League (English football) players
2014 Caribbean Cup players
Antigua and Barbuda expatriate footballers
English sportspeople of Antigua and Barbuda descent